Banbury railway station serves the town of Banbury in Oxfordshire, England. The station is operated by Chiltern Railways, on the Chiltern Main Line, and has four platforms in use.

History

Banbury Bridge Street station opened on 2 September 1850, some four months after the Buckinghamshire Railway (L&NWR) opened its  terminus. When meadows and the recently disused racecourse at Grimsbury were sold to the Great Western Railway (GWR) in about 1850, the owner also sold the other part of his land, north of the Middleton road to the Banbury Freehold Land Society, which was financially backed by Cobb's Bank, on which to build middle-class houses, but development was slow at the time and some plots were never built upon.

The station was going to be part of the GWR's Oxford and Rugby Railway, before the problems with changing gauges at  prevented it. The  single track extension from Oxford to Banbury did open, and at first Banbury was just a single platform through station (works were continuing to Birmingham) however the popularity of the line meant that the route was soon double tracked barely two years later, and the station was given an extra platform in an up and down configuration. By 1882, an extra Up Goods Line had been laid on the East side of the Station [outside the Train Shed]; together with a Transfer Line to the LNWR Route. In 1903, Banbury had south and north bays "cut" into the Up Platform; along with an extra bay on the downside at the North end. There was a Down Goods Loop north of the Station; all this to cope with traffic from the Great Central Main Line, which joined at Banbury North Junction in 1900. The inclusion of terminating bays and goods loops reflected Banbury's increasing strategic position in the National network. In 1904 the refreshment rooms were rebuilt to the designs of Percy Emerson Culverhouse. The Station was rebuilt into its present form in 1958.

Banbury Bridge Street station occupied one of the most strategic and important locations in the entire rail network in Britain. For example, the Aberdeen to Penzance Express used the  branch of the GCR through Banbury as part of its journey and the "Ports to Ports Express" between the North-East (Newcastle,  etc.) and South Wales (Cardiff) used the Great Central Railway branch line and the Banbury and Cheltenham Direct Railway, and passed through Banbury as well as Newcastle — , Newcastle — Southampton,  —  Sleeper, Bournemouth — /, etc. Most Cross Country Services in Britain passed through Banbury, which helped the growth of the town and its cattle market.

After nationalisation in 1948, the station was renamed Banbury General to distinguish it from Banbury Merton Street station. Banbury Merton Street was closed in 1966, and the suffix was officially discontinued by 1974, although it remained on tickets until the Edmondson type ticket machines were replaced in the early 1980s.

The current railway station is on the site of the Great Western Railway line that opened to Banbury in 1850. The original station's overall roof survived until 1953, five years before a rebuild in 1958. The rebuilding of the station was delayed due to the Second World War, and could have been based on the GWR's new station at Leamington Spa, which was finished just before war commenced. The new station of 1958 was designed by Howard Cavanagh.

Passenger traffic at Banbury has grown rapidly: between 2003 and 2010, the number of passengers using the station increased by 85%.

Former services through Banbury
 "Ports to Ports" Middlesbrough/Hull/ — Cardiff/Newport///
 Bournemouth — Birkenhead
 Birkenhead — Dover Margate and Brighton via Reading and Redhill. This was operated jointly by the GWR and the SR, southbound once daily by one company and northbound by the other.

The station

Layout

After the rebuilding of the station in 1956–58 there were six numbered platforms: these were formed into two islands, the western one having two through tracks and a single bay at its northern end, whilst the eastern island had a single through platform, but two bays, one at each end. The two islands were connected to each other, and to the station entrance hall, by a footbridge.

At that time, the three through platforms were numbered 1, 3 and 4 from west to east, whilst the three bays were numbered 2, 5 and 6. All but one have since been re-designated: the present-day platform 2 was formerly platform 3, whilst the unnumbered bay at its northern end was originally platform 2, and present-day platforms 3 and 4 were formerly platforms 4 and 6 respectively. Platform 5, at the northern end of the present platform 3, has lost both its track and its number.

The present station has four numbered platforms, numbered 1 to 4 from west to east, and grouped as two island platforms.

Platform 1 is also used as an emergency through platform if one of the others is out of use for any reason.

Platforms 2 and 3 are through platforms: platform 2 is for Chiltern services north to Birmingham Moor Street/Snow Hill and Kidderminster, and CrossCountry services to Birmingham New Street, Manchester, the North East and Scotland, while platform 3 is for Chiltern services to London via Bicester, and CrossCountry services to Oxford, Reading and the South Coast.

Platform 4 is a bay platform for terminating Chiltern services to and from London. An unnumbered bay platform (known as Platform 2 Bay) was used by terminating Chiltern services to and from Birmingham and Stratford until it was filled in during August 2016. Freight loops serve as main through lines for non-stopping freight trains. Most passenger services passing Banbury stop at the station, and heritage trains stop here to fill up on water.

Many redundant loops and sidings surround the station: most of these were for goods services stopping at Banbury, which have all disappeared. Two goods loops survive to allow the stoppage of goods trains for the uninterrupted passage of passenger trains.

The station is being considered for remodelling to improve operational flexibility by Network Rail.

Two new lower-quadrant semaphore signals were installed in late 2010 to allow passenger trains in platforms 1 and 2 to depart in the up direction. Their numbers were BS27 and BS33, and they were controlled from Banbury South signal box.

A nine-day long blockade to re-signal and complete alterations to the track layout at the station layout began on 30 July 2016. Both remaining manual signal boxes were closed with new multiple aspect signalling commissioned and all lines through the station coming under the control of the West Midlands Signalling Centre at Saltley.

Services
Chiltern Railways provide most trains to Banbury, their Monday - Friday off-peak service consisting of:

3 trains per hour to 

2008 train fire
On 14 March 2008 a CrossCountry Voyager forming the 16:25 service to  had a fire in the air vents while standing at platform 2 at Banbury. Passengers in both trains at the station and the station itself were evacuated. Fire crews arrived and the fire was extinguished. There were no reported deaths or injuries from the blaze, which was only a minor fire.

2015 Harbury Tunnel landslip
Between 31 January and 13 March 2015, all services north of Banbury were suspended and replaced by buses due to a major landslide at Harbury Tunnel, north of Fenny Compton. Over 100,000 tons of earth and rock subsided on the western side of the line during ongoing work to stabilise the cutting, which had been a known problem area for some years (and had suffered a similar but smaller collapse in February 2014). Remedial work was carried out to remove more than 350,000 tons of material, re-profile the cutting walls and improve drainage. In the meantime, all Chiltern services from London and all CrossCountry services from Reading and the South Coast terminated at Banbury and a rail replacement bus service was run to Leamington Spa for onward connections to Birmingham New Street, Manchester, the East Midlands and the North East. Network Rail reopened the line on 13 March 2015, three weeks earlier than originally estimated.

2016 signal box demolitions
Both Banbury South and Banbury North signal boxes were demolished in mid-2016, the South box on 10 August and the North box on 8 October. Tours of the North box were run between 10 August and 2 October with commemorative tickets issued. The lever frames from the North box were moved to Ironbridge to be preserved. The nameboards from both boxes were presented by Network Rail to the Great Western Trust at Didcot Railway Centre where one of them is on display in The Signalling Centre.

Services and operators

See also
 History of Banbury, Oxfordshire

References

External links

Railway station
Railway stations in Oxfordshire
DfT Category C1 stations
Former Great Western Railway stations
Railway stations in Great Britain opened in 1850
Railway stations served by Chiltern Railways
Railway stations served by CrossCountry
Railway stations served by Great Western Railway
Howard Cavanagh railway stations